Open Road Recordings, a division of RGK Entertainment Group Ltd., is a Canadian record label specializing in country music. it was established by Ron Kitchener in 2003 and distributed through Universal Music Canada. The label also owns an American division in Nashville, Tennessee.

Open Road artists
 Blackjack Billy
 Dustin Bird
 Graham Scott Fleming
 Tim Hicks
 Hunter Brothers
 Dayna Reid

Former artists
 Dean Brody
 Ridley Bent
 Emerson Drive
 The Ennis Sisters
 Adam Gregory
 Adam Harvey
 The Higgins
 High Valley
 Willie Mack
 Jake Mathews
 Jason McCoy
 Madeline Merlo
 One More Girl
 Amy Nelson
 Tara Oram
 Prairie Oyster
 Johnny Reid
 The Road Hammers
 River Town Saints
 Sons of Daughters
 Doc Walker
 The Wilkinsons
 The Wilsons
 Taylor Swift

See also
 List of record labels

References

External links
Official Site

Record labels established in 2003
Canadian country music record labels